Entocybe is a genus of agaric fungi in the family Entolomataceae. It was circumscribed in 2011 to contain several former Entoloma species having obscurely angular spores with 6–10 angles (some formerly classified as Rhodocybe). Based on three locus DNA analysis, these species form a distinct, well-defined clade in the Entomolataceae that is basal to Entoloma. The genus name, a combination of Entoloma and Rhodocybe, alludes to similarities with species in those genera. E. melleogrisea, found in a subboreal forest in Québec, Canada, was described as a new species in 2013. Unlike the mostly collybioid fruit bodies of most other Entocybe species, E. melleogrisea has a tricholomatoid stature.

Species

See also
List of Entolomataceae genera

References

Entolomataceae